The Ivy Preparatory School League is a high school athletic conference of university-preparatory schools in New York City and its suburbs. The Ivy Preparatory School League has no affiliation with the Ivy League universities.

Members
The league comprises the following schools:
 Collegiate School in Manhattan
 Dalton School in Manhattan
 Hackley School in Tarrytown, Westchester County
 Fieldston School in Riverdale, Bronx
 Horace Mann School in Riverdale, Bronx
 Poly Prep in Brooklyn, New York
 Riverdale Country School in Riverdale, Bronx
 Trinity School in Manhattan

Former members
 Adelphi Academy in Brooklyn
 New York Military Academy in Cornwall, Orange County
 St. Paul's  School in Garden City, Nassau County, now closed
 The Stony Brook School in Brookhaven, Suffolk County

Sports offered
The league offers competition in the following sports:

Fall sports
 Cross country (boys)
 Cross country (girls)
 Field hockey (girls)
 Soccer (boys)
 Soccer (girls)
 Tennis (girls)
 Volleyball (girls)
 Water Polo(coed)

Winter sports
 Basketball (boys)
 Basketball (girls)
 Indoor track (boys)
 Indoor track (girls)
 Squash
 Swimming (boys)
 Swimming (girls)
 Wrestling (boys)

Spring sports
 Baseball (boys)
 Golf
 Lacrosse (boys)
 Lacrosse (girls)
 Outdoor track (boys)
 Outdoor track (girls)
 Softball (girls)
 Tennis (boys)
 Ultimate Frisbee (boys)
 Ultimate Frisbee (girls)

Not all member schools compete in all sports. Collegiate School is an all-boys school.

Notable athlete alumni

High school graduation year is in parentheses.

Collegiate
 Ian McGinnis (1997), basketball, NCAA-leading rebounder at Dartmouth

Hackley
 Danya Abrams (1993), basketball, three-time All-Big East first-team at Boston College

Horace Mann
 Pedro Álvarez (2005), baseball, Pittsburgh Pirates and others
 Harrison Bader (2012), baseball, St. Louis Cardinals
 Kimberly Belton (1976), basketball, member of the Stanford Athletic Hall of Fame and 1980 draft choice of the Phoenix Suns
 Bethany Donaphin (1998), basketball, New York Liberty

Poly Prep
 Joakim Noah (2004, from Lawrenceville School), basketball, Chicago Bulls and others
 Brian Flores (1999), football, Boston College, Head Coach for Miami Dolphins
 Isaiah Wilson (2017), football Tennessee Titans, Offensive Lineman

Riverdale
 Calvin Hill (1965), football, Dallas Cowboys and others

Trinity
 John McEnroe (1977), tennis
 Patrick McEnroe (1984), tennis

References

 
High school sports conferences and leagues in the United States